Mirage is the first EP by the Danish band Scarlet Pleasure. It was released on September 22, 2014. It consists of 7 tracks recorded over 10 months, among other their debut single "Windy".

Track listing

References

2014 EPs
Scarlet Pleasure albums